Yamhill County Transit, officially the Yamhill County Transit Area (YCTA), is the public transit authority of Yamhill County, Oregon, United States. It operates local bus routes in the cities of McMinnville and Newberg, as well as commuter bus routes to Hillsboro and Tigard in the Portland metropolitan area, Salem, and Grand Ronde.

References

External links

Yamhill County Transit

2007 establishments in Oregon
Bus transportation in Oregon
Transit agencies in Oregon
Transportation in Yamhill County, Oregon
Transportation in Washington County, Oregon